Harem is a 1985 French romantic drama directed by Arthur Joffé. It was filmed in Morocco, particularly El Jadida.

Plot
Diane Andrews is a haughty Wall Street floor trader without any romantic interests. One day, Sheikh Selim, the ruler of an oil-rich Gulf country, who has been tracking Diane has her drugged, kidnapped, and brought to his harem overseen by eunuch Massoud. Despite Diane's initial protests, as the two come to appreciate each other, they fall in love. Meanwhile, a series of events makes Selim realise that he can no longer rule his country and harem the way he and his ancestors used to do. Eventually, he takes the radical decision to evacuate his isolated castle.

Reception
Harem was nominated for five César Awards in 1986 and won two; César Award for Best Costume Design and César Award for Best Poster.

References

External links

1985 films
1985 romantic drama films
French romantic drama films
Films about kidnapping
Films shot in Morocco
Films shot in New York City
Films set in castles
Films set in the Middle East
Films set in New York City
Films scored by Philippe Sarde
English-language French films
1980s English-language films
Films directed by Arthur Joffé
1980s French films